Owen Wilson is an actor, comedian, screenwriter, and producer. 

Wilson is known for his career as an onscreen comedian and member of the Frat Pack, having starred in such comedies as Zoolander (2001), Starsky & Hutch (2004), Wedding Crashers (2005), and You, Me and Dupree (2006). He is also known for the family films  Marley and Me (2008), and the Night at the Museum film series (2005-2014). Among his notable voice acting credits are Lightning McQueen in the Cars film series (2006–present) and Coach Skip in Fantastic Mr. Fox (2009). Wilson currently stars as Mobius M. Mobius in the Disney+ limited series Loki (2021). 

Wilson has collaborated on multiple occasions with independent filmmaker Wes Anderson, the two jointly having been nominated for an Academy Award and British Academy Film Award for their screenplay The Royal Tenenbaums (2001). In 2011, he was nominated for the Golden Globe Award for Best Actor – Motion Picture Musical or Comedy for his performance in the Woody Allen time traveling romantic comedy Midnight in Paris (2011). He also received two Screen Actors Guild Award nominations for Outstanding Ensemble Cast in a Motion Picture for Allen's Midnight in Paris (2011), and Anderson's The Grand Budapest Hotel (2014). In 2014, he received the Independent Spirit Robert Altman Award along with the cast of Paul Thomas Anderson's Inherent Vice (2014).

Major associations

Academy Awards

British Academy Film Awards

Golden Globe Award

Screen Actors Guild Award

Independent Spirit Awards

Writers Guild of America Awards

Critics awards

Miscellaneous awards

Notes

References 

Wilson, Owen